Magdalene is an outdoor 2005 sculpture by Dessa Kirk, designed specifically for the triangular garden in Congress Plaza, east of S. Michigan Avenue at East Ida B. Wells Drive, in Chicago's Grant Park, in the U.S. state of Illinois. The statue is part of the Chicago Public Art Program.

Kirk created the sculpture specifically for this site. In the springtime, tulips line the female figure's feet, and in the summertime the sculpture becomes part of the surrounding garden, as vines and flowers fill up the skirt of her dress. Kirk has similar installations in Columbus, Indiana; Three Oaks, Michigan; and Anchorage, Alaska.

See also
 2005 in art
 List of public art in Chicago

References

2005 establishments in Illinois
2005 sculptures
Millennium Park
Outdoor sculptures in Chicago
Statues in Chicago